The Bohn Motor Company Automobile Dealership, at 2700 S Broad in New Orleans, Louisiana, was built in 1925 and was expanded during  1944 to 1951. It was designed by architect Emile Weil (1878-1945). It was listed on the National Register of Historic Places in 2011.

The first story of the building included two automobile showrooms.

References

External links

Auto dealerships on the National Register of Historic Places
National Register of Historic Places in New Orleans
Italianate architecture in Louisiana
Commercial buildings completed in 1925
1925 establishments in Louisiana
Transportation buildings and structures on the National Register of Historic Places in Louisiana